Monsieur N. is a 2003 British-French film directed by Antoine de Caunes. It tells the story of the last years of the life of the Emperor Napoléon (played by Philippe Torreton),  who was imprisoned by the British on St Helena. Napoléon retained a loyal entourage of officers who helped him plot his escape, and evaded the attentions of Major-General Sir Hudson Lowe (Richard E. Grant), the island's overzealous Governor.

The film suggests that Napoléon could have escaped to Louisiana, where he died, and that the body exhumed and now at Les Invalides is that of Napoléon's officer Cipriani. The film also suggests that Napoléon and his young new English wife, Betsy Balcombe, could have attended the ceremony of "Napoléon's" burial in the Invalides.

Plot
Napoleon is imprisoned on the island of Saint Helena in the South Atlantic Ocean. Here he dreams of how to escape from his captivity in his last "battle".

Reception
The film was well-received. , 71% of the 21 reviews compiled by Rotten Tomatoes are positive, with an average rating of 6.27/10. The website's critics' consensus reads: "Fueled by performances as polished as its visuals, Monsieur N. is a flawed yet largely absorbing look at an imagined chapter of Napoleon's exile."

The film received a positive but guarded review in The New York Times, which praised Philippe Torreton's performance but thought the narrative too complex for an audience not initiated in Napoléon's history.

Cast

References

External links
 Official website 
 

2003 films
2003 drama films
2003 multilingual films
2000s British films
2000s English-language films
2000s French films
2000s French-language films
French drama films
Films about Napoleon
Corsican-language films
Films directed by Antoine de Caunes
British drama films
Films with screenplays by René Manzor
Films set on Saint Helena
French multilingual films
British multilingual films